The House of Fregoso or di Campofregoso was a noble family of the Republic of Genoa and Liguria in general, divided into numerous branches, whose members distinguished themselves on numerous historical occasions; many of them held the position of Doge of Genoa, some were also lords of Sarzana; others finally held various fiefdoms, lands and titles along the arc of the Ligurian Apennines, such as the county of Sant'Agata Feltria which was owned by Agostino Fregoso. The Fregoso family monopolized the Dogate's lifetime office, becoming the dynasty who produced the highest number of doges in the history of the Republic.

History 
Originating from the locality of Val Polcevera, on the hill above Rivarolo, they were enterprising merchants, active in the political affairs of the city from the 13th century, with Rolando, a castellan from Voltaggio, Gavi and Porto Venere.

The family had a strong influence on Genoese political life and thirteen members of the Fregoso family became doges; the first of them was Domenico di Campofregoso, but the most famous was certainly Paolo Fregoso, emblematic personage of a political history dominated by ambition and by the calculation of circumstances which was generally a characteristic of the family.

In addition to the Doges, other personalities distinguished themselves in various fields, military like Abraham , Augustine and Cesare Fregoso, writers like Antoniotto or ecclesiastics like Federigo Fregoso.

The Fregoso family lost its political importance in the first half of the 16th century with the end of the Dogate of Ottaviano Fregoso, imprisoned by the Spaniards and died in prison in Ischia. In 1528, the family was incorporated in the Alberghi of the families De Fornari and De Ferrari ; resumed its name in 1576, but since then it no longer had any historical importance.

Doges of the Republic of Genoa 

 Battista Fregoso
 Battista Fregoso (1450-1505)
 Domenico di Campofregoso
 Giacomo Fregoso
 Giano I di Campofregoso
 Giano II di Campofregoso
 Lodovico di Campofregoso
 Ottaviano Fregoso
 Pietro Fregoso
 Pietro di Campofregoso
 Paolo di Campofregoso
 Spinetta Fregoso
 Tomaso di Campofregoso

Other important members 

 Agostino Fregoso: Condottiero
 Cesare Fregoso: Condottiero
 Paolo Battista Fregoso: Condottiero
 Giano Fregoso: Bishop
 Federigo Fregoso: Nobleman, prelate and general.
 Pomellina Fregoso: Lady Consort of Monaco by marriage to Jean I, Lord of Monaco, and the mother of Lord Catalan
 Galeotto di Campofregoso: Condottiero

See also 

 Doria (family)
 House of Grimaldi
 Adorno family
 House of Spinola
 Pallavicini family
 Fieschi family

References

 
Families of Liguria
Republic of Genoa families